An overpass (called an overbridge or flyover in the United Kingdom and some other Commonwealth countries) is a bridge, road, railway or similar structure that crosses over another road or railway. An overpass and underpass together form a grade separation. Stack interchanges are made up of several overpasses.

History

The world's first railroad flyover was constructed in 1843 by the London and Croydon Railway at Norwood Junction railway station to carry its atmospheric railway vehicles over the Brighton Main Line.

Highway and road
In North American usage, a flyover is a high-level overpass, built above main overpass lanes, or a bridge built over what had been an at-grade intersection. Traffic engineers usually refer to the latter as a grade separation. A flyover may also be an extra ramp added to an existing interchange, either replacing an existing cloverleaf loop (or being built in place of one) with a higher, faster ramp that eventually bears left, but may be built as a right or left exit.

A cloverleaf or partial cloverleaf contains some 270 degree loops, which can slow traffic and can be difficult to construct with multiple lanes. Where all such turns are replaced with flyovers (perhaps with some underpasses) only 90 degree turns are needed, and there may be four or more distinct levels of traffic. Depending upon design, traffic may flow in all directions at or near open road speeds (when not congested). For more examples see Freeway interchange.

Pedestrian
A pedestrian overpass allows traffic to pass without affecting pedestrian safety.

Railway
Railway overpasses are used to replace level crossings (at-grade crossings) as a safer alternative. Using overpasses allows for unobstructed rail traffic to flow without conflicting with vehicular and pedestrian traffic. Rapid transit systems use complete grade separation of their rights of way to avoid traffic interference with frequent and reliable service.

Railroads also use balloon loops and flying junctions instead of flat junctions, as a way to reverse direction and to avoid trains conflicting with those on other tracks.

Gallery

See also
Footbridge
Skyway
Stack interchange
Viaduct
Wildlife crossing

References

Bridges
Road infrastructure
Railway buildings and structures

pl:Estakada